Hla Swe (also known as Bullet Hla Swe; born 28 September 1960) is a Burmese politician who served as an MP in the House of Nationalities for Magwe Region № 12 constituency from 2011 to 2016.

After he ended up his term length in the Parliament in 2016, he published a weekly newspaper The Bullet News Journal. He is known for his outspoken, Islamophobic and homophobic statements.

Early life and education
Hla Swe was born in military base in Chauk, Magway Region to parents Boe Thar and his wife Than Kyi. His father, Boe Thar was a former military officer. He attended Basic Education High School No. 1 Kyaukse and straight out of high school in 1978.

Military and governmental career
Hla Swe joined the Myanmar Army in 1978 and most of his 25 years of service was spent fighting armed ethnic groups in border areas. In 2003, he took up an administrative role for the State Peace and Development Council military government in Gangaw Township, Magwe Region. In 2006, he was retired as a lieutenant colonel in Myanmar Army and took up the post of director of Myanmar Radio and Television.

Political career
He served as a central executive committee member of the Union Solidarity and Development Party. In 2010 election, he was elected as an MP for House of Nationalities. He is clearly pro-military, he believes the Tatmadaw should gradually ease its grip on parliament.

In 2015 election, he run for House of Nationalities seat from Gangaw Township constituency, but lost to National League for Democracy (NLD) candidate.

Public image
In 1980–1981, as a military officer, he had deliberately forced LGBTs to serve as military porters, a practice internationally criticised as a war crime. He supported the crackdown by Myanmar Army in 1988 Pro-Democracy Protests which resulted in 3,000 estimated deaths. In 2015, he generated controversy for posting on social media about his hatred for LGBTs.

He courted controversy during the run-up to 2015 election by playing on anti-Rohingya sentiment to win the election. He blamed his defeat on 2015 election not on the success of his NLD rival, but on Aung San, Father of the Nation of modern-day Myanmar.

Sued for sedition under Article 124(a)
On August 7, 2019, Kyauktada township deputy administrator Myo Myint filed a complaint against Hla Swe with the township court for allegedly condemning state leaders while speaking at a rally against the US imposition of visa sanctions on Myanmar military leaders in front of Yangon City Hall on August 3. He told supporters in the speech, “If the United States came and bombed government ministries, I would accept that. Hey bombers, try it. If all [state leaders] died, that would be good”.

Hla Swe was sued for sedition under Article 124(a) on 8 August 2019. The arrest warrant was issued with an address in Magwe Region, where he lives. If he is prosecuted under this article, he faces seven to 20 years in prison or a fine. On 28 December 2020, he surrendered himself to the Yangon Western District Police Station after absconding for over one year. His charge was dropped on 11 May 2021 by State Administration Council in the aftermath of the 2021 Myanmar coup d'état.

Quotes
“I think I am too old for politics. Look at our politicians, they are all around 70, there needs to be a younger generation of politicians. But if my party wants me to run, I will run.”

“The situation today is good, we should not go back to the past, but should move forward towards democracy.”

References

External links 
 
Amyotha Hluttaw Parliament : Hla Swe's MP Profile

Union Solidarity and Development Party politicians
Members of the House of Nationalities
1960 births
Living people
People from Mandalay Region
Burmese military personnel